Tequila Harris is an American mechanical engineer and professor. She is Professor of Manufacturing at the George W. Woodruff School of Mechanical Engineering. She works on polymer processing and mechanical system design.

Education and early career 
Harris earned her Bachelor's degree at Lane College in 2000. She was a Master's student at the Rensselaer Polytechnic Institute, and became a postgraduate in 2003. In  October 2006, Harris graduated with a PhD in Mechanical Engineering. She was awarded the United Negro College Fund Young Alumnus Award of the Year in 2005. She was a National Science Foundation research trainee between 2005 and 2006. She has been received a multiple fellow, such as General Electric Faculty of the Future, Clare Luce Booth Fellow from Henry Luce Foundation, Alliances for Graduate Education and the Professoriate (AGEP) Fellow and Class of 1969 Teaching Fellows.

Career 
Harris joined the Georgia Institute of Technology as an Assistant Professor in 2006. She leads the Polymer Thin Film Processing group at Georgia Institute of Technology. She became principal investigator at National Science Foundation CAREER Award between 2010 and 2015. The award let her investigate Proton-exchange membrane fuel cells using theoretical and numerical modelling. She is interested in the interface between materials and substrates. They looked at how mechanical properties (stress, relaxation and shrinkage) impact the durability of membranes. As part of the grant she developed the Educators Leading Energy Conservation and Training Researchers of Diverse Ethnicities (ELECTRoDE) program for minority students and faculty.

She worked with the University of Rhode Island to fabricate environmentally friendly nanoparticles for water purification projects in Jordan. She worked with the Jordan University of Science and Technology to study membrane biofouling due to chemicals and microbes. In 2015 she was accepted as a fellow at the Executive Leadership in Academic Technology and Engineering program at Drexel University.

She attended a ceremony at the White House with Kim Cobb as the National Science Foundation launched a new work-life balance initiatives.

Harris has been featured on the Stories from the NNI podcast of the National Nanotechnology Initiative for her work with polymer thin film manufacturing.

Honors and awards 
She won a second National Science Foundation award in 2017, allowing her to translate thin film fabrication from the lab to factory floor. She focuses on multi-layer thin film technologies for things such as organic solar cells, transistors and sensors. She is interested in the molecular mechanisms and flaws in fabrication that cause failure in manufacturing. This includes looking at how defects influence transport properties in polymer membrane films. They also look at how fluid flows through porous media.  She won the Lockheed Martin Inspirational Young Faculty Award.

She holds several patents for producing a proton-conducting membrane thin films. She was awarded the International Society of Coating Science and Technology L. E. Scriven Young Investigator Award in 2018. She is the first African-American to win the award since it began in the 1990s.

References 

Lane College alumni
Georgia Tech faculty
Rensselaer Polytechnic Institute alumni
American materials scientists
Living people
21st-century women engineers
African-American women engineers
American women engineers
African-American engineers
Year of birth missing (living people)
American mechanical engineers
Women materials scientists and engineers
21st-century American women